North Mountain may refer to:

Geography

Mountains
North Mountain (Catskills) in New York, US
North Mountain (Virginia-West Virginia), US
North Mountain (Nova Scotia), Canada
North Mountain (Pennsylvania), US

Other places
North Mountain (conservation area), a wildland in western Virginia, US
North Mountain, West Virginia, US, an unincorporated community

Other uses
North Mountain (film), a 2015 film

See also
Great North Mountain in Virginia and West Virginia
North Fork Mountain in West Virginia
Northmount, Alberta; neighbourhood
Northmont, Ohio; schools
 Mountain (disambiguation)
 North (disambiguation)